Patrick Gayle (born 26 October 1965) is a Jamaican cricketer. He played in ten first-class and four List A matches for the Jamaican cricket team from 1988 to 1994.

See also
 List of Jamaican representative cricketers

References

External links
 

1965 births
Living people
Jamaican cricketers
Jamaica cricketers